The Young Voices Brandenburg are a jazz and popular music choir of over 20 voices, composed of 18 to 26-year-old male and female singers.  The musical ensemble is specifically auditioned from the State of Brandenburg, Germany on a two-year rotation.  They have toured the United States, China, and South Africa as well as having recorded numerous highly acclaimed CDs.  The group has been featured with prominent media periodicals/broadcasts such as Der Tagesspiegel, Cue TV and RBB.

The ensemble has been conducted by acclaimed jazz and pop singer/educator Marc Secara since its beginnings in 2000 until the year 2019.  The ensemble was initiated in 2000; their first CD release was that same year.  The  Young Voices Brandenburg has been a highly successful educational and musical organization sponsored by Verband der Musik- und Kunstschulen Brandenburg, Deutscher Musikrat, Deutsches Musikinformationszentrum. Their record label (Junge Töne) is also sponsored by this state agency and also supports an honors youth symphony orchestra and jazz ensemble from Brandenburg, Germany. The Young Voices Brandenburg is a unique project, no other German state offers younger singers this type of choral ensemble.

Young Voices Brandenburg style and music is influenced by groups dating back through the 1920s in Germany and United States such as the Comedian Harmonists and Gospel choirs of Thomas Dorsey.  More contemporary pop and jazz harmony oriented groups they draw from are the Hi-Lo's, Swingle Singers, Singers Unlimited, Manhattan Transfer, Take 6 and the New York Voices. The repertoire for the group has been commissioned from noted composers/arrangers in Europe and the United States to include Nicolai Thärichen, Darmon Meader, Juan Garcia, Jack Cooper, Friedemann Matzeit, Tanja Pannier and Matthias Knoche.

Awards and achievements 

On March 10, 2017, the Young Voices Brandenburg were awarded the Sonderpreis für Zivilcourage und Gemeinsinn by the Tourismus-Marketing Brandenburg. This was the sixth time prize was awarded for "civil courage and mutualism." The prize is awarded to people and institutions of Brandenburg who are accomplishing special projects for the enrichment of Brandenburg and German society.  Their tour of the State of Brandenburg during the summer of 2016 was catalyst for the award.

Discography/DVD
2003 SING! (Junge Töne)
2006 OBERHAMMERGAU (Playground Records)
2009 VERTONT (Junge Töne)
2011 ECHOES OF MOTOWN (Playground Records)
2013 1000 (Junge Töne)
2016 SOUND OF HOME (Junge Töne)
2018 SOUL JOURNEY (Mons)
2019 YOUNG VOICES MATTER (Junge Töne)

See also
Verband der Musik- und Kunstschulen Brandenburg
Deutscher Musikrat
Marc Secara
Jiggs Whigham

References

External links 

Website of the Young Voices Brandenberg

Young Voices Brandenburg - "1000" EPK
RBB: Record Release von "1000"  

German jazz ensembles
Vocal jazz ensembles
German choirs
Musical groups established in 2000